The 2019–20 Liga IV Brașov was the 52nd season of the Liga IV Brașov, the fourth tier of the Romanian football league system. The season began on 24 August 2019 and was ended officially on 18 June 2020, due to 2019–20 COVID-19 pandemic. 

Corona Brașov was crowned as county champion and the representative of Brașov County at the promotion play-off to Liga III.

Team changes

To Liga IV Brașov
Relegated from Liga III
 —

Promoted from Liga V Brașov
 Cetățenii Ghimbav

From Liga IV Brașov
Promoted to Liga III
 —

Relegated to Liga V Brașov
 —

Other changes
 Hărman withdrew from Liga III after the end of the last season and enrolled in Liga IV.
 Corona Brașov received the permission to enroll in Liga IV.

League table

Championship play-off
A championship play-off tournament between the best 3 teams (after 16 rounds) was played to decide the county champion and the team that will qualify for the promotion play-off to Liga III. The teams started with all the points accumulated until the interruption of the regular season.

Play-off table

Promotion play-off

Champions of Liga IV – Brașov County face champions of Liga IV – Alba County and Liga IV – Harghita County.

Region 3 (Center)

Group B

See also

Main Leagues
 2019–20 Liga I
 2019–20 Liga II
 2019–20 Liga III
 2019–20 Liga IV

County Leagues (Liga IV series)

 2019–20 Liga IV Alba
 2019–20 Liga IV Arad
 2019–20 Liga IV Argeș
 2019–20 Liga IV Bacău
 2019–20 Liga IV Bihor
 2019–20 Liga IV Bistrița-Năsăud
 2019–20 Liga IV Botoșani
 2019–20 Liga IV Brăila
 2019–20 Liga IV Bucharest
 2019–20 Liga IV Buzău
 2019–20 Liga IV Călărași
 2019–20 Liga IV Caraș-Severin
 2019–20 Liga IV Cluj
 2019–20 Liga IV Constanța
 2019–20 Liga IV Covasna
 2019–20 Liga IV Dâmbovița
 2019–20 Liga IV Dolj
 2019–20 Liga IV Galați 
 2019–20 Liga IV Giurgiu
 2019–20 Liga IV Gorj
 2019–20 Liga IV Harghita
 2019–20 Liga IV Hunedoara
 2019–20 Liga IV Ialomița
 2019–20 Liga IV Iași
 2019–20 Liga IV Ilfov
 2019–20 Liga IV Maramureș
 2019–20 Liga IV Mehedinți
 2019–20 Liga IV Mureș
 2019–20 Liga IV Neamț
 2019–20 Liga IV Olt
 2019–20 Liga IV Prahova
 2019–20 Liga IV Sălaj
 2019–20 Liga IV Satu Mare
 2019–20 Liga IV Sibiu
 2019–20 Liga IV Suceava
 2019–20 Liga IV Teleorman
 2019–20 Liga IV Timiș
 2019–20 Liga IV Tulcea
 2019–20 Liga IV Vâlcea
 2019–20 Liga IV Vaslui
 2019–20 Liga IV Vrancea

References

External links
 Official website 

Liga IV seasons
Sport in Brașov County